Gradski stadion is a football stadium in Mojkovac, Montenegro. It is situated on the Tara riverbank. It is used for football matches. The stadium is the home ground of FK Brskovo.

History
On the site of a prior football stadium built after World War II, Gradski stadion was constructed in 2009 with a capacity of 1,500 seats. It is the home of FK Brskovo and the host of Interregional Sport Games (MOSI) 2009.

Pitch and conditions
The pitch measures 110 x 62 meters. The stadium does not meet UEFA criteria for European competitions.
There is one additional field near the main ground, used for training and youth-league games.

See also
FK Brskovo
Mojkovac

External links
 Stadium information

References 

Football venues in Montenegro
Mojkovac